Jordan-Matthews High School is found in Siler City, North Carolina. This high school is a 2-A classification with about 840 students and 80 staff members. It is often referred to as J-M. Its county rivals include Chatham Central High School (Bear Creek, NC), and Northwood High School (Pittsboro, NC).

Basic Information 
The school team mascot is the Jet. The team was originally the Blue Phantoms, but changed after the schools were integrated in 1968−69 to avoid controversy after a small riot at a football game in 1971 over the resemblance to the KKK because of the use of white sheets. The school's colors are royal blue and gold.

The school offers a block style schedule which allows students to take eight classes a year. A wide variety of AP classes and career development classes are offered here.
In 2009 Us News and World Report assigned JM a Silver Medal as one of the best high schools in America.

Sports and clubs are popular activities at the school. Some clubs such as AIM, DECA, FBLA, and HOSA compete at district, state, and national levels. Students can also participate in  Arts programs which include Art, Band under the direction of J.C. Harper and Chorus under the direction of Matthew Fry which is assisted by JMArts, the Jordan-Matthews High School Arts Foundation, a nonprofit created in 2011 to enhance arts education at Jordan-Matthews. In the past, sports such as women’s tennis, golf, and men’s basketball and soccer have won state championships. The book "A Home on the Field", was written by the Jordan-Matthews soccer coach, Paul Cuadros, and a documentary series on NuvoTV was made Los Jets built around the team and its history.

Student population 
Chatham County, where the school is located, has experienced an influx of Hispanics over the last ten to fifteen years. The number of Hispanic children enrolled in school has increased by 598% from 1990 to 1998. In the 2010−11 school year, of the 732 students, 42% were Hispanic, 36% were White, 21% were Black, and less than 1% were American Indian or Asian.

Athletics 
The Wells Fargo Cup is awarded to a school in each conference that exhibits an outstanding athletic program. Points are awarded for 1st, 2nd, or 3rd in each sport. JM was awarded their 5th cup in a row in 2012.

Football 
The Jordan-Matthews Jets, are members of NCHSAA Division 2-A and The 2-A Mid-State Conference. Under head coach Marty Scotten, the Jets football team has had 3 straight years of 10+ wins seasons. Jordan-Matthews is in its 2nd year as being a part of the Mid-State 2A conference.

Athletic facilities 
Frank N. Justice GymnasiumHas a small/unique style and known for a pumped atmosphere, recently renovated, Home to Basketball teams

Jimmy Warford FieldBrand new scoreboard put up in 2010, College/Major league field dimensions, Home to Baseball teams

Phil E. Senter StadiumField is well kept, directly behind the school, Brand new scoreboard put up in 2011, Home to Football, Soccer, and Track teams.

6 Tennis CourtsHome to Boys and Girls Tennis

Jets Softball FieldBehind Phil Senter Stadium's Concessions/Locker Rooms, Home to Softball

Notable alumni 
 George Edwards, coach in the National Football League (NFL)
 Greg Harris, MLB pitcher (1988–1995)
 Eddie Mason, NFL linebacker (1995–2002)

Further reading 
 Phantomarie (Yearbook), by the North Carolina Department of Natural and Cultural Resources, UNC-Chapel Hill University Library, and North Carolina Digital Heritage Center

References 

Public high schools in North Carolina
Schools in Chatham County, North Carolina